Several North American ice hockey leagues operated under the Central Hockey League name in the 20th and 21st centuries:

Defunct leagues
 Central Hockey League (1925–1926) (later the American Hockey Association), a semi-professional league
 Central Hockey League (1931–1935), a minor professional league
 Central Hockey League (1951–1960), a senior amateur league
 Central Hockey League (1963–1984), a minor professional league, formerly the "Central Professional Hockey League"
 Central Hockey League (1992–2014), a minor professional league
 USA Central Hockey League (2018), a junior league based in the southwest United States

See also
 Central Canada Hockey League, a junior league based in Eastern Ontario known as the Central Hockey League in 2010–2011
 CHL (disambiguation)